Paul Boos (born June 2, 1958 in Sioux Falls, South Dakota) is an American dancer, ballet master, archivist, and répétiteur. He danced with New York City Ballet from 1977 until 1990 before becoming a guest teacher for the Royal Danish Ballet. In addition to teaching internationally, he is part of a select group of répétiteurs sanctioned by the Balanchine Trust to set the ballets of George Balanchine. Having previously served as Project Associate since 2016, in 2021, Boos was appointed to Director of the Video Archives for the George Balanchine Foundation.

Early life and career 

Boos was born and raised in Sioux Falls, South Dakota. In a variation on the "Billy Elliot story", he started studying dance when his mother enrolled his two sisters in ballet class and was persuaded to sign him up as well. At 15, while attending a dance convention in Chicago, Boos was invited by David Howard to study at the Harkness House on full scholarship. Following that summer intensive, he auditioned for the American Ballet Theatre School where Patricia Wilde offered him a stipend and a double scholarship to the ABT school and the Professional Children's School. After a year of study he successfully auditioned for the School of American Ballet where he was taught by Mme. Antonina Tumkovsky and Stanley Williams and worked with Suki Schorer, Alexandra Danilova, Jerome Robbins, and George Balanchine. At the conclusion of his graduating SAB Student Workshop performances, in which he danced principal roles in Balanchine's Symphony in C and Robbins' Dances at a Gathering, Boos was assigned to work with Balanchine on Juilliard's production of Le roi malgré lui. During these rehearsals he was invited to join New York City Ballet. He was 18 years old.

Described as "an elegant dancer of compelling dignity", while at City Ballet Boos danced a diverse range of featured roles and original parts from the Balanchine and Robbins ballets. For Balanchine, his repertoire included A Midsummer Night's Dream, Symphony in C, Le Tombeau de Couperin, The Four Temperaments, Who Cares?, Donizetti Variations, The Nutcracker, Chaconne, Danses Concertantes, La Sonnambula, Kammermusik No. 2, Allegro Brillante, Diamonds, Stars & Stripes, and Stravinsky Violin Concerto. For Robbins, he danced in The Goldberg Variations, Glass Pieces, Eight Lines, The Four Seasons, Fanfare, Piccolo Balletto, Verdi Variations, and Dances at a Gathering.

In 1990, after dancing with City Ballet for 13 years, Boos moved to Copenhagen to accept a position as guest teacher with the Royal Danish Ballet.

Ballet master and répétiteur 

After a year of teaching at the Royal Danish Ballet, Boos received a telegram from Balanchine's longtime assistant Barbara Horgan asking him to rehearse Serenade and Theme and Variations at the Mikhailovsky Theatre in St. Petersburg. Upon successfully completing this assignment, in 1992 he was appointed a sanctioned répétiteur for the Balanchine Trust, a select group who are tasked with setting Balanchine's ballets on dance companies around the world. As a répétiteur his job is to protect the integrity of the copyrights of George Balanchine's work in the present and for the future. In tandem with staging ballets, Boos also serves as balletmaster and master teacher in order to properly prepare dancers to perform the works of Balanchine.

On behalf of the Balanchine Trust, Boos has set ballets on some of world's leading dance companies, including the Bolshoi Ballet, Paris Opera Ballet, Mariinsky Ballet, Het Nationale Ballet, Boston Ballet, La Scala Theatre Ballet, Pacific Northwest Ballet, National Opera and Ballet of Bulgaria, Sarasota Ballet, and Tokyo Ballet. In addition to his work as balletmaster and répétiteur, since 2016 Boos has served as Project Associate of the George Balanchine Foundation's Interpreters Archive. In 2021, he was appointed to Director of Video Archives of the Balanchine Foundation. In this capacity, Boos works with Nancy Reynolds to preserve Balanchine's oeuvre by recording original principal cast members and dancers who worked closely with Balanchine as they coach dancers of today.

When he is not setting ballets or conducting research, Boos teaches open classes at STEPS on Broadway as one of their guest teachers, and serves as the Head of the Pre-Professional Division at Rye Ballet Conservatory in Rye, New York.

Balanchine Trust Ballets

Personal life 
Boos is the sixth of seven children. His father was a marine, sheriff, U.S. Marshal, and state representative. His mother was a nurse and founding director of the South Dakota School of Nursing. His parents met while they were both serving in the military during World War II.

In 2013, Boos married Hajime Issan Koyama, a Japanese Soto Zen Buddhist priest and hospice chaplain. The couple lives in New York City.

External links 
 Official site
The George Balanchine Foundation

References 

American male ballet dancers
Ballet teachers
New York City Ballet dancers
Balanchine Trust repetiteurs
School of American Ballet alumni
Living people
1958 births